"Shoota" is a song by American rapper Playboi Carti featuring American rapper Lil Uzi Vert. It was released from Carti's debut studio album Die Lit on May 11, 2018. The song was produced by Maaly Raw.

Composition
The song sees the rappers melodically rapping about their expensive jewelry, while Playboi Carti also rhymes about using his gun and having a crew of shooters. Lil Uzi Vert handles the first and second verses, while Carti performs the chorus and third verse.

Critical reception
Sheldon Pearce of Pitchfork praised the song, writing, "The beat never drops during the Uzi verse, creating a fascinating sort of tension; instead, [they burrow] into the synth bed with [their] melodic flows, generating [their] own rhythms. When the drums finally do kick in, Carti springs to life, brandishing weapons and matching Uzi's Auto-Tune. Carti's greatest gift is being interesting without doing much of anything, and here he's at his minimalistic best."

Charts

Certifications

References

2019 songs
Playboi Carti songs
Lil Uzi Vert songs
Songs written by Playboi Carti
Songs written by Lil Uzi Vert
Songs written by Maaly Raw